Chrustowo may refer to the following places:
Chrustowo, Grodzisk Wielkopolski County in Greater Poland Voivodeship (west-central Poland)
Chrustowo, Koło County in Greater Poland Voivodeship (west-central Poland)
Chrustowo, Oborniki County in Greater Poland Voivodeship (west-central Poland)
Chrustowo, Piła County in Greater Poland Voivodeship (west-central Poland)
Chrustowo, Września County in Greater Poland Voivodeship (west-central Poland)